Ceryx ginorea is a moth of the subfamily Arctiinae. It was described by Charles Swinhoe in 1894. It is found in Assam, India.

References

Ceryx (moth)
Moths described in 1894